Oier Luengo Redondo (born 11 November 1997) is a Spanish footballer who plays as a central defender for Real Oviedo.

Club career
Born in Amorebieta-Etxano, Biscay, Basque Country, Luengo was a SD Amorebieta youth graduate. He made his first team debut on 30 October 2016, coming on as a late substitute for goalscorer Koldo Obieta in a 1–2 Segunda División B home loss against CD Toledo.

Luengo established himself as a starter in the 2017–18 season, and scored his first senior goal on 16 September 2017 by netting his side's second in a 2–3 home loss to Real Sociedad B. On 13 June of the following year, he signed for Athletic Bilbao and was assigned to the reserves also in the third division.

On 7 January 2019, after featuring rarely for the Lions, Luengo was loaned back to his former club Amorebieta until June. Upon returning, he started to feature more regularly, but still left the club on 14 June 2021 as his contract was due to expire.

In July 2021, free agent Luengo returned to Amorebieta, with the club now in Segunda División. He made his professional debut on 14 August, starting in a 0–2 away loss against Girona FC.

On 4 July 2022, after Amorebieta's relegation, Luengo signed for fellow second division side Real Oviedo on a two-year contract.

References

External links

1997 births
Living people
People from Amorebieta-Etxano
Spanish footballers
Footballers from the Basque Country (autonomous community)
Association football defenders
Segunda División players
Segunda División B players
SD Amorebieta footballers
Bilbao Athletic footballers
Real Oviedo players
Sportspeople from Biscay